Carlo Mancini (Milan, 1829–1910) was an Italian painter noted for his rural scenes and Oriental subjects.

Biography
Born into a Milanese family of ancient and noble lineage, Carlo Mancini grew up in a liberal cultural climate and mixed with some of the leading figures in Milan’s musical world. Regular guests in the family villa at Merate, included: Gioachino Rossini, Gaetano Donizetti and Giuseppe Verdi as well as Arrigo Boito, with whom he formed a close friendship.

It was probably the landscape painter Rinaldo Barbiano di Belgioso, an uncle on his mother’s side, who first interested him in painting. Given that the only evidence of his studies under the guidance of Giuseppe Bisi, then holder of the chair in landscape at the Brera Academy, is an end-of-course exam work of the mid-1850s (1857) and that his name appears on no official academic documents, it has recently been suggested that his pictorial apprenticeship took place outside the institution. At the culmination of his studies, in 1857, he exhibited Winter Morning at the International Exhibition in Paris.

A trip in Brittany and Normandy led to early contact with English landscape painting and steered Mancini’s artistic interests towards faithful depiction from life but attenuated by late-Romantic overtones in the handling of light. Until he stopped showing work at exhibitions in 1875, he focused on rural subjects, mostly drawn from the countryside in Brianza and from memories of his youthful stay in Normandy, which were favourably reviewed by critics and won him some marks of official recognition. In his later career, he visited Egypt, Arabia, India, Burma and China and brought home hundreds of sketches which he kept in a locked, iron chest until his death. In 1929, these sketches were donated to the Galleria Moderna d'Arte. From the 1870s, following his trip to the Far-East and Middle-East, his work included more Oriental subject matter.

Work
Mancini worked primarily in watercolour, however he occasionally worked in oil.

Select list of works

 November
 Sunset over Po
 Lombard Plains
 Luogo Solitario
 In Valle Brentano
 On the shores of the Brenta.

See also
 List of Orientalist artists
 Orientalism

References

 Elena Lissoni, Carlo Mancini, online catalogue Artgate by Fondazione Cariplo, 2010, CC BY-SA (source for the first revision of this article).

Other projects

1829 births
1910 deaths
19th-century Italian painters
20th-century Italian painters
Italian landscape painters
Italian male painters
Painters from Milan
Orientalist painters
19th-century Italian male artists
20th-century Italian male artists